Missing: The Other Side is a 2020 South Korean television series starring Go Soo and Huh Joon-ho. It is a fantasy-thriller based in a mysterious village where spirits live. It premiered on OCN from August 29 to October 11, 2020, every Saturdays and Sundays at 22:50 (KST) time slot.

The second season is moved from OCN to tvN from December 19, 2022 to January 31, 2023, every Mondays and Tuesdays at 20:50 (KST) time slot.

Series overview

Synopsis
Kim Wook (Go Soo) uses his good looks and smooth talking ways to swindle people out of their money. However, one day, after a mishap with some bad guys he arrives at Duon Village. It's no ordinary village. It's a place where the dead live—people whose bodies were never found. This village is invisible to the outside world, but for some reason, Kim Wook can see these villagers. He finds himself drawn to these people and ends up helping them solve the mystery of their deaths.

Cast

Main
 Go Soo as Kim Wook
 An ex-swindler who scammed people who are extorting money from poor people. By chance, he entered Duon Village after running away from gangsters whom he saw were abducting a woman. 
 Huh Joon-ho as Jang Pan-seok
 The secret-keeper of Duon Village who is a living person. He lives in a shabby house nearby in the mountain, and was the one who saved Kim Wook when the latter fell from a cliff and landed on a tree. From then on, he became good friends with Kim Wook, & takes care of the latter. He had been the seeker for the missing bodies of the villagers for 10 years. He pretended to be a dead soul when he entered the village, with only Thomas Cha knows his and Kim Wook's true identities.
 Ahn So-hee as Lee Jong-ah
 A bright civil servant leading a double life as a hacker. She is a professional when it comes to computing and always helps Kim Wook in finding information and always comes to rescue the team. She resigned from her job after Kim Nam-guk's death to take over his pawnshop.
 Ha Jun as Shin Joon-ho
 A competitive detective who is restless and dedicated. He would catch the criminals assigned to him by any means, including to find his fiancée who went missing after their argument.
 Seo Eun-soo as Choi Yeo-na
 Shin Joon-ho's fiancée who is an orphan. She was abducted by unknown men and her soul ended up at Duon Village, where she met Kim Wook.
 Song Geon-hee as Thomas Cha / Cha Kwon-muk
 Foreman of Duon Village who have been there for over 100 years. In the village, he runs a cafe named Hawaii Cafe which also serve as an entrance for the dead to enter the village.
 Lee Jung-eun as Kang Eun-sil (Season 2) 
She was a captain with 30 years of experience while she was alive. But now he had become a figure with a mysterious past behind the roaring laughter as he lived in Industrial Complex 3.
 Kim Dong-hwi as Oh Il-yong (Season 2)
He is a third-year resident of an industrial complex struggling to track down his own death and his lost body.

Supporting

Chamjoeun Pawnshop 
 Moon Yoo-kang as Kim Nam-gook

Duon Village 
 Kang Mal-geum as Kim Hyeon-mi
 Lee Joo-won as Park Yeong-ho
 Lee Joo-myung as Jang-mi
 Ahn Dong-yeop as Park Beom-soo
 Lee Ki-chan as Park Byeong-eun
 Go Dong-ha as Kim Joon-soo
 Jang Sun-yool as Seo Ha-neul
 Park Hye-jin as Choi Mi-ja
 Jo Yeon-woo as Lee Eun-ji
 Lee Won-gu as Woo Il-suk

Blue Sunshine (푸른 햇살) Orphanage
 Kim Jung-eun as Jo Myeong-soon
 Kang Seung-ho as Jang Myung-gyu

Missing Persons Squad 
 Ji Dae-han as Baek Il-doo
 Kim Gun-ho as Im Wan-sik
 Park Ye-ni as Detective Park
 Lee Kyung-jae as Detective Lee

Choiseung Construction 
 Jung Young-sook as Han Yeo-hee, chairwoman of Choiseung Construction
 Lee Yoon-jae as Lee Yong-min
 Park Joong-geun as Han Sang-gil
 Yoo Seung-il as Yoo Seung-ho
 Choi Min-ah as Kim Soo-yeon, Han Yeo-hee's deceased daughter

Ilgong Freezing 
 Kim Nak-yun as Manager Wang Myung-chul
 Yoo Il-han as gangster
 Park Won-suk as gangster
 Lee Da-il as gangster

Village Industrial Complex 3 
 Kwon Ah-reum as Yang Eun-hee
 Ji Dae-han as Bake Il-do
 Lim Sun-woo as Moon Se-young 
 Jung Eun-pyo as Jung Young-jin
 Choi Myung-bin as Moon Bo-ra

Extended
 Son Ji-yoon as Seo Ha-neul's mother
 Hong Yoon-jae as Ahn Jin-ho, Seo Ha-neul's stepfather 
 Lee Hyo-bi as Jang Hyeon-ji, Jang Pan-seok's missing daughter
 Lee Kyo-yeop as Lee Geun-hyung, Jong-ah's hometown friend.
 Song Duk-ho as Jo Jung-sik  
 Cho Eun-sol as Park Young-joon
 Lee Deok-hee as Kim Myeong-ja
 Kim Tae-yeon as Alice
 Kwon Hyuk as Lee Tae-hyun (Season 2)
 Park Sang-hoon as Min Seung-jae  
 Lee Ga-yeon as Min Ye-won
 Kim Se-dong as Lee Soo-ok
 Oh Yu-na as Choi Jeong-ah
 Nam Hyun-woo as Go Sang-cheol
 Jung Yoon-jae as Kim Pil-joong
 Nam Hyun-woo as Go Sang-cheol  
 Kim Seo-heon as Choi Ha-yoon
 Yoo Il-han as Jang Do-ri
 Moon Ji-won as Ahn Hye-joo
 Lee Cheon-moo as Lee Young-rim
 Go Eun-young as Oh Yoo-jung
 Kim Gun-ho as Lee Man-sik
 Jae Han as Baek Il-do

Special appearance 
 Im Si-wan as Mysterious man

Viewership

Season 1

Season 2

Notes

References

External links
  
 
 
 
 
 

Korean-language television shows
2020 South Korean television series debuts
OCN television dramas
South Korean mystery television series
South Korean fantasy television series
Television series by Studio Dragon
Television productions suspended due to the COVID-19 pandemic
TVN (South Korean TV channel) television dramas
2023 South Korean television series endings